The third set of elections to Kesteven County Council were held on Thursday, 7 March 1895. Kesteven was one of three divisions of the historic county of Lincolnshire in England; it consisted of the ancient wapentakes (or hundreds) of Aswardhurn, Aveland, Beltisloe, Boothby Graffoe, Flaxwell, Langoe, Loveden, Ness, and Winnibriggs and Threo. The Local Government Act 1888 established Kesteven as an administrative county, governed by a Council; elections were held every three years from 1889, until it was abolished by the Local Government Act 1972, which established Lincolnshire County Council in its place.

Forty-six electoral divisions of the new Council were outlined in December 1888. For the 1892 election, Sleaford and Bourne, which were initially two member divisions, were split, the former into Sleaford East and Sleaford West, the latter into Bourne and Morton. Nearly every candidate was returned unopposed, with contests in only eight divisions. Of these, six involved political parties; the Liberals won four and the Conservatives two.

Results by division

Ancaster

Barrowby

Bassingham

Bennington

Billingborough

Billinghay

Bourne

Bracebridge

Branston

Bytham

Caythorpe

Claypole

Colsterworth

Corby

Deeping

Gonerby

Grantham no. 1

Grantham no. 2

Grantham no. 3

Grantham no. 4

Grantham no. 5

Grantham no. 6

Grantham no. 7

Heckington

Heighington

Helpringham

Kyme

Martin

Metheringham

Morton

Navenby

Osbournby

Ponton

Rippingale

Ropsley

Ruskington

Skellingthorpe

Sleaford East

Sleaford West

Stamford no. 1

Stamford no. 2

Stamford no. 3

Stamford no. 4

Thurlby

Uffington

Waddington

Wellingore

Wilsford

April 1895 by-election

The Council met on 16 March 1895 to elect its chairman and aldermen. The only sitting councillor elected an alderman was W. B. Harrison of Grantham no. 7 division. This triggered a by-election, in which two candidates came forward. The first, Joshua Lincoln, was an alderman on Grantham Municipal Borough Council, while his opponent was Charles Basker, a magistrate and town councillor.

 N.B. Two ballot papers were spoilt.

References

1895
1895 English local elections
19th century in Lincolnshire